Alabama's 7th congressional district is a United States congressional district in Alabama that elects a representative to the United States House of Representatives. The district encompasses Choctaw, Dallas, Greene, Hale, Lowndes, Marengo, Pickens, Perry, Sumter and Wilcox counties, and portions of Clarke, Jefferson, Montgomery and Tuscaloosa counties. The district encompasses portions of the Birmingham, Montgomery and Tuscaloosa/Northport urban areas.  The largest city entirely within the district is Selma.

The district has been majority nonwhite, with a majority of African-American residents, since the redistricting following the 1990 census. As such, and with a Cook Partisan Voting Index rating of D+14, it is the only Democratic district in Alabama. It is currently represented by Democrat Terri Sewell.

Character 
Alabama's 7th congressional district was first defined in 1843; it has continued since then with the exception of the years 1867–1873 during the Reconstruction era. The geographic area represented by this district has changed over time, depending upon the number of U.S. Representatives apportioned to Alabama. Around the turn of the 20th century, the district included the city of Gadsden. Over time, the district was redefined to include the area around Tuscaloosa. The last two representatives for the district before its reconfiguration as a majority-minority area were Richard Shelby (now Alabama's senior senator) and Claude Harris, both Tuscaloosa residents.

The shape of the current district was largely established in 1992, when it was reconstituted as a majority-minority district under provisions of the Voting Rights Act of 1965, as amended in 1982 to encourage greater representation for minorities in Congress. Half of the western Alabama portion of the district was moved to the 4th district, and a large portion of Tuscaloosa County was moved into the 6th district, which had primarily been based around Birmingham. To counter the loss in population and to create the majority-minority, many counties from the Black Belt region, a rural expanse in Alabama with a high proportion of African-American residents descended from workers on cotton plantations, were added to the district, as was an arm extending from Tuscaloosa roughly along the Interstate 20/59 corridor into Jefferson County to take in most of the black precincts of Birmingham. Most of Birmingham's white residents remained in the 6th district. The three representatives elected from the district following reconfiguration—Earl F. Hilliard, Artur Davis, and Terri Sewell—have all been residents of Birmingham.

Mostly minor changes in the following two redistrictings have not substantially changed the shape of the district. But, western portions of Montgomery County have been restored to this district, including large swaths of inner-city Montgomery in the redistricting following the 2010 census. This area had earlier been removed after the 2000 census. The district contains urbanized areas of Birmingham, Montgomery, and Tuscaloosa, and ten of the fourteen rural counties in the Black Belt. Three of the state's largest colleges are located in the district: Alabama State University in Montgomery, the University of Alabama in Tuscaloosa, and the University of Alabama at Birmingham. Alabama's 7th Congressional district is a good example of a state that has experienced partisan gerrymandering over the last decade. In the 2010 redistricting cycle, Republicans drew district lines to pack together several major Democratic communities into a single district, ensuring that Democrats were only elected to one seat. Alabama's District 7 reaches into several other districts' regions to pick out Democratic voters. The 7th district is the most gerrymandered in the state.

Democrats have represented the 7th district in all but 6 years since 1843.

Recent election results from statewide races
A majority of voters in the district are African Americans who support the Democratic Party and its candidates.

List of members representing the district

Recent election results

2002

2004

2006

2008

2010

2012

2014

2016

2018

2020

2022

See also

Alabama's congressional districts
List of United States congressional districts

References
Specific

General
 
 
 Congressional Biographical Directory of the United States 1774–present
 
 

07
Choctaw County, Alabama
Clarke County, Alabama
Dallas County, Alabama
Greene County, Alabama
Hale County, Alabama
Jefferson County, Alabama
Lowndes County, Alabama
Marengo County, Alabama
Montgomery County, Alabama
Pickens County, Alabama
Perry County, Alabama
Sumter County, Alabama
Tuscaloosa County, Alabama
Wilcox County, Alabama
Constituencies established in 1843
1843 establishments in Alabama
Constituencies disestablished in 1861
1861 disestablishments in Alabama
Constituencies established in 1868
1868 establishments in Alabama
Constituencies disestablished in 1963
1963 disestablishments in Alabama
Constituencies established in 1965
1965 establishments in Alabama